James Chau (Chinese: 周柳建成 Zhōuliǔ Jiànchéng) who was born on 11 December 1977, is a journalist, television presenter, and United Nations goodwill ambassador. He previously anchored the main evening news on state-owned China Central Television (CCTV). In 2009, he was appointed by the United Nations as China's first UNAIDS goodwill ambassador. He wrote a newspaper column for the Chinese Communist Party-owned tabloid Global Times. His appointment as goodwill ambassador to the World Health Organization attracted attention due to his role in presenting forced confessions while working for Chinese state-run broadcaster CGTN.

Education 
Chau was born in England and educated at City of London School and St. Edmund's College, University of Cambridge, where he was Varsity News Features Editor. His parents were born in Indonesia and Hong Kong.

Television 
After graduating from Cambridge, and interning at Vogue and Mirror Group Newspapers, he moved to Hong Kong for his first newsroom position. From 2001 he was a reporter and later an anchor at TVB Pearl. Chau joined China Central Television in 2004, where he featured as a main presenter on the 24-hour CCTV News English-language station. Since April 2010, he also co-fronted the channel's flagship China 24 show.

UNAIDS Goodwill Ambassador 
In August 2009, the United Nations announced his appointment as its first UNAIDS Goodwill Ambassador on the Chinese Mainland.

See also
 Joint United Nations Programme on HIV/AIDS

References

External links
 Official website

Living people
Chinese columnists
1977 births
HIV/AIDS activists
Alumni of the University of Cambridge
China Central Television
British male journalists